54-40 is an eponymous album by Canadian alternative rock band 54-40. The album was recorded independently and was released in 1986 as their major-label debut. The album is nicknamed "The Green Album" by fans because the album artwork consists of mostly green fill. The track "I Go Blind" was later covered by Hootie & the Blowfish.

Track listing
 "Baby Ran" – 4:33
 "I Wanna Know" – 4:14
 "I Go Blind" – 2:46
 "Being Fooled" – 3:19
 "Take My Hand" – 4:35
 "Grace and Beauty" – 2:58
 "Me Island" – 5:11
 "Holy Cow" – 3:56
 "Alcohol Heart" – 4:21
 "Untitled" – 1:05

References

1986 albums
54-40 albums